Akinlabi Olasunkanmi (born March 1956), is a Nigerian businessman and politician who was appointed as minister responsible for youth development in the cabinet of president Umaru Yar'Adua in July 2007. In 2014, he ran as a People's Democratic Party (PDP) candidate for governor of Osun State but was defeated in the primary round.

References

External links
 

Living people
1956 births
Peoples Democratic Party members of the Senate (Nigeria)
Federal ministers of Nigeria
Yoruba politicians
Howard University alumni
Columbia Business School alumni
People from Osun State
21st-century Nigerian politicians